Leonard Lopate (born September 23, 1940) is an American radio personality. He is the host of the radio talk show Leonard Lopate at Large, broadcast on WBAI, and the former host of the public radio talk show The Leonard Lopate Show, broadcast on WNYC. He first broadcast on WKCR, the college radio station of Columbia University, and then later on WBAI, before moving to WNYC.

Career
Lopate came to radio relatively late in life. Born in Brooklyn and raised in Williamsburg, he attended Brooklyn College and later Hunter College, where he trained as a painter (he studied with Ad Reinhardt and Mark Rothko), and worked in advertising for fifteen years. He was given the chance to host his first talk show on WBAI in 1977; what began as a whim became his life's work.

Lopate's longest-running program on WBAI was Round Midnight, a weekly late-night show, which featured interviews and free-form discussion on a variety of topics with listeners who called in to the station. The show ran through the mid-1980s, ending when Lopate moved to WNYC-FM to host a midday talk show with radio veteran Pegeen Fitzgerald, which subsequently evolved into The Leonard Lopate Show.

Lopate also appears regularly at the 92nd Street Y, where he interviews celebrities and moderates his ongoing panel series "Comparing Notes". He has appeared in a similar capacity at the Brooklyn Academy of Music, Queens College, Brooklyn College, the New York Public Library, the Brooklyn Public Library, the Alliance Française, and The New School. He has also created a series of discussions on literature for the writers’ organization, PEN International.

The Leonard Lopate Show

The Leonard Lopate Show aired on WNYC from noon to 2 pm every weekday until December, 2017. Segments of the show are available as podcasts found on iTunes and on the station's website.

The show's Peabody Award-winning format typically consisted of four interviews ranging from twenty to forty minutes in length and covered a broad range of topics including current events, history, literature, the arts, including jazz and gospel music, food and wine (he has won three James Beard Awards), and science. Guests were often interviewed to accompany a book release. Lopate interviewed politicians, poets, painters, novelists, filmmakers, actors, dancers, and more than a few Nobel and Pulitzer Prize winners. He frequently interviewed actors, playwrights and producers to talk about their current NYC theatre productions.

Lopate introduced two ongoing features to the program. One was called "Please Explain", in which he talked with experts on a wide variety of topics that were not tied to book or movie releases and could be described as general interest. In 2006, some of the "Please Explain" topics he delved into included sainthood, nanotechnology, insomnia, infertility, and meditation. The other feature was called "Underreported", in which Lopate delved deeply into political and social issues deemed not to have received sufficient media coverage.

For the show's twentieth anniversary, in 2005, Tom Brokaw interviewed Lopate about the history of the show, Lopate's goals, and Lopate's interviewing style.

The show was previously called New York & Company.

Sexual harassment firing

In February 2017, a producer discussed with human resources at WNYC multiple comments Lopate had made to her that she considered sexually provocative. While she did not consider any single comment to be "fireable", she said the comments made her feel uncomfortable. The February incident led to an investigation that "resulted in one-on-one anti-harassment training for him and a warning to Lopate that he was creating an uncomfortable work environment." In March 2017, "a second producer filed a complaint against Lopate... describing comments she felt were inappropriate."

On December 21, 2017, with the "MeToo" movement in full swing across the country, WNYC fired both Lopate and Jonathan Schwartz, stating that investigations found that each individual had violated WNYC's standards "for providing an inclusive, appropriate, and respectful work environment"; they had been placed on leave 15 days earlier pending investigations.  One producer complained that, as she was preparing for a segment about a cookbook, Lopate informed her that the name "avocado" comes from the Aztec word for "testicle". Another producer said that in 2009, when she wore a new dress, Lopate said, "I didn't know you were so 'bosomy'." 

Lopate's former show was replaced by Midday on WNYC, It had a rotating array of hosts and followed a format similar to that of The Leonard Lopate Show. WNYC abandoned that show for All of It with host Alison Stewart on September 17, 2018.

Leonard Lopate at Large 
On May 24, 2018, Lopate came back to the radio waves as the host of the Leonard Lopate at Large show. The program is broadcast on WBAI 99.5 FM (New York), and on WBAI.org, from Mondays through Fridays from 1:00 to 2:00 PM. It is also broadcast on the Robin Hood Radio network (AM 1020 WHDD-FM 91.9, WBSL-FM 91.7, WLHV-FM 88.1, and soon on 97.5 FM) Saturday afternoons from 4:00 to 5:00 PM and Tuesday afternoons from 12:00 to 1:00 PM.  Lopate typically interviews one guest per show.

Personal life
Lopate's younger brother is the writer Phillip Lopate.

His mother, Frances Lopate, was an actor.  She was famous for an Alka Seltzer commercial, along with her other work. Phillip Lopate wrote the book, A Mother's Tale about her.  Leonard discussed his mother with Phillip on his show On February 22, 2017. 

Lopate lives with his wife, painter and artist Melanie Baker, whom he married in 2012. A previous marriage ended in divorce.

References

External links 

 Official website for Leonard Lopate at Large broadcasts
 Access to recent Lopate shows
 Renowned Radio Host Recounts Career Highlights
 Leonard Lopate in conversation with the Brooklyn Rail

American radio personalities
1940s births
Living people
People from Williamsburg, Brooklyn
New York Public Radio
Brooklyn College alumni